John Van Alstyne Weaver, Jr. (July 17, 1893 – June 14, 1938, often credited as John V. A. Weaver) was an American poet, novelist and screenwriter whose poems attracted the approbation of H. L. Mencken, whose works were produced on stage and on film, and who had several screenwriting credits for work on properties where he was not the author of the original work.

Background
Weaver was born 17 July 1893 in Charlotte, North Carolina, the son of John Van Alstyne Weaver, Sr. and Anne Randolph Tate Weaver. He married American actress Peggy Wood  in 1924 and the couple had one son, David Weaver, in 1927.

Weaver was educated at Hamilton College, graduating in 1914. His literary career began with employment at the Chicago Daily News in 1919 as a book editor, and continued with employment at the Brooklyn Daily Eagle. He ceased newspaper work around in 1924 to pursue a purely literary career. He moved to work for Paramount in 1928.

Weaver attracted notice for his adaptation of American vernacular to iambic pentameter rhythms. His financial success came from successful adaptations of his work on stage and in films and, later, from screenwriting.

He died 15 June 1938 of tuberculosis in Colorado Springs, Colorado. (See Tuberculosis treatment in Colorado Springs).

Works 
In American: poems (1921; also: John Van Alstyne Weaver, In American: the collected poems of John V. A. Weaver, ed. H. L. Mencken (1939)
"Bootleg", in Nonsensorship; sundry observations concerning prohibitions, inhibitions, and illegalities, by (edited by) Heywood Broun, G. P. Putnam's (1922)
 Margey wins the game (1922)
Finders: more poems in American (1923)
Love 'em and leave 'em; a comedy in three acts (1926) (with George Abbott); adapted from a verse novel by Weaver; also done as the 1926 silent film Love 'Em and Leave 'Em   and later as a talking picture under the title The Saturday Night Kid in 1929.
Her knight comes riding (1928)
To youth (1928)
Turning Point (1930)
More "In American" poems (1930)
Trial balance, a sentimental inventory (1932)
Joy-girl (1932)

References

External links 
 
 
 

1893 births
1938 deaths
20th-century American novelists
American male novelists
20th-century American poets
American male screenwriters
Hamilton College (New York) alumni
20th-century American dramatists and playwrights
American male poets
American male dramatists and playwrights
20th-century American male writers
Screenwriters from New York (state)
20th-century American screenwriters